Floris is a city in Davis County, Iowa, United States. The population was 116 at the time of the 2020 census.

History
A post office was opened at Floris in 1847.

Geography
Floris is located on the south margin of the Soap Creek floodplain. It is approximately 8.5 miles north-northeast of Bloomfield.

Demographics

2010 census
As of the census of 2010, there were 138 people, 58 households, and 41 families living in the city. The racial makeup of the city was 99.3% White and 0.7% from two or more races. Hispanic or Latino of any race were 0.7% of the population.

There were 58 households, of which 27.6% had children under the age of 18 living with them, 60.3% were married couples living together, 3.4% had a female householder with no husband present, 6.9% had a male householder with no wife present, and 29.3% were non-families. 24.1% of all households were made up of individuals, and 20.6% had someone living alone who was 65 years of age or older. The average household size was 2.38 and the average family size was 2.80.

The median age in the city was 45 years. 23.2% of residents were under the age of 18; 5.7% were between the ages of 18 and 24; 21% were from 25 to 44; 28.9% were from 45 to 64; and 21% were 65 years of age or older. The gender makeup of the city was 50.0% male and 50.0% female.

2000 census
As of the census of 2000, there were 153 people, 61 households, and 42 families living in the city. The racial makeup of the city was 98.69% White and 1.31% Asian. Hispanic or Latino of any race were 2.61% of the population.

There were 61 households, out of which 36.1% had children under the age of 18 living with them, 50.8% were married couples living together, 8.2% had a female householder with no husband present, and 31.1% were non-families. 26.2% of all households were made up of individuals, and 16.4% had someone living alone who was 65 years of age or older. The average household size was 2.51 and the average family size was 3.00.

In the city, the population was spread out, with 28.1% under the age of 18, 6.5% from 18 to 24, 25.5% from 25 to 44, 24.2% from 45 to 64, and 15.7% who were 65 years of age or older. The median age was 39 years. For every 100 females, there were 98.7 males. For every 100 females age 18 and over, there were 96.4 males.

The median income for a household in the city was $19,375, and the median income for a family was $27,917. Males had a median income of $26,250 versus $3,750 for females. The per capita income for the city was $9,438. About 21.4% of families and 22.4% of the population were below the poverty line, including 31.7% of those under the age of eighteen and none of those 65 or over.

Education
The Davis County Community School District operates local area public schools.

References

Cities in Iowa
Cities in Davis County, Iowa